Cossus siniaevi is a moth in the family Cossidae. It is found in China (Shaanxi).

References

Natural History Museum Lepidoptera generic names catalog

Cossus
Moths of Asia
Moths described in 2004